Zhu Rui (朱瑞, 1905–1948) was born in Suqian, Jiangsu province. He was an artillery commander of the Chinese People's Liberation Army (PLA) from October 1946 to October 1948.

Early life
When he studied at Xuzhou Peixin Middle School, he was expelled from academic status. After that, he went to study in Nanjing. In the summer of 1924, he joined the Socialist Youth League. In the same year, he was admitted into Guangdong University. In 1925, he passed an entrance examination of Zhongshan University in Moscow. After his graduation from Zhongshan University in 1927, he furthered his studies in artillery barracks in the Soviet Union. In 1928, he joined the Communist Party of Soviet Union, and then switched to Chinese Communist Party.

In 1929, Zhu came back to China. He was once Chinese special correspondent, the chief of Red Army’s general headquarters, a teacher of Red Army’s schools, a member of the Standing Committee of the CPC Central Committee Political Bureau so on.  At the end of the year 1932, he was appointed as Red Army Committee.  In August, 1934, he was appointed as political director of legion one. Then he joined the Red Army. 

After the Anti-Japanese War (1937-1945), Zhu led teachers and students of Yanan artillery school to the Northeast, collecting weapons abandoned by Japanese soldiers and developing artillery (troops) actively.  In 1946, he took on the position of Artillery Commander and the president of artillery school.

Death
On October 1, 1948, during the fighting against the Kuomintang (KMT), Zhu went to check the damage of defensive wall, unfortunately, he died on the way because of landmines. At that time, he was only 43 years old.  The Central Military Commission decided to name the artillery school in Northeast as "Zhu Rui Artillery School" in memory of him.

Contributions
When he was the president of artillery school, he put special emphasis on training artillery leaders, summarizing the experience in fightings, which laid a solid foundation for the instruction of PLA Artillery Forces.

References

1905 births
1948 deaths
Chinese military personnel of World War II
Delegates to the 7th National Congress of the Chinese Communist Party
Eighth Route Army personnel
Moscow Sun Yat-sen University alumni
People's Liberation Army officers